Meadow Rain Walker (born November 4, 1998) is an American model and the only child of Fast and Furious actor Paul Walker.

Early life 
Walker was born on November 4, 1998 as the only child of actor Paul Walker and Rebecca Soteros. She grew up in Hawaii and moved to live with her father in California aged 13. Her father died in 2013, after which there was a custody battle. Her parents kept their daughter out of the spotlight, and she did not seek publicity until she started her modeling career. She kept her father's collection of crystals, including one that is the size of a laptop computer.

Career

Modeling 
Walker first signed to DNA Models in 2017. She has worked with Proenza Schouler and Givenchy, which she wore at her wedding. She opened Givenchy's Fall Winter 2021 ready-to-wear show. At the Schouler shows, she has worked alongside Ella Emhoff.

Personal life 
In August 2021, Walker announced her engagement to actor Louis Thornton-Allan. They were married that October in the Dominican Republic. Though the wedding was a small and private affair, it was highly publicized, including an interview with Vogue. She was given away by her father's Fast & Furious co-star Vin Diesel, who is her godfather. She also attended the premiere of F9.

Walker has an interest in yoga, acupuncture and holistic medicine. She continues her father's charitable work through the conservation organization The Paul Walker Foundation, which she founded in 2015. The organization offers grants to marine biology students. She has also worked with Soma Sara, who runs the anti-rape movement Everyone's Invited.

References

External links
 

1998 births
Living people
Female models from Hawaii
Female models from California